Anne Serre (born September 7, 1960) is a French writer. She was born in Bordeaux. Her debut novel Les Gouvernantes came out in 1992, and she has written more than a dozen books since. Les Gouvernantes has been translated into English by Mark Hutchinson. Cleveland Review of Books reviewed the English translation and called it "surreal and erotic."

References

1960 births
Living people
20th-century French novelists
20th-century French women writers
21st-century French novelists
21st-century French women writers
French women novelists
Writers from Bordeaux